Yeonpyeong Island or Yeonpyeongdo (referred to by North Korea as Yŏnphyŏng Islet) is a group of South Korean islands in the Yellow Sea, located about  west of Incheon and  south of the coast of Hwanghae Province, North Korea.

The principal population centre is Yeonpyeong-ri, where the island's ferry port is located. Several other small islands comprise the rest of the group.

The island group constitutes Yeonpyeong-myeon, one of the subdivisions of Ongjin County, Incheon, South Korea.

Yeonpyeong Island is known for its crab fishery.

Maritime border disputes 

Yeonpyeong lies near the Northern Limit Line (NLL) and is only  from the North Korean coastline. The 1953 Armistice Agreement which ended the Korean War specified that five island groups, including Yeonpyeong, would remain under South Korean control. North Korea subsequently respected the UN-acknowledged western maritime border for many years until around the mid-1990s.

However, since the 1990s, North Korea has disputed the NLL. The North Korean government claims a border farther south that encompasses valuable fishing grounds (though it skirts around South Korean-held islands such as Yeonpyeong). The claim, nonetheless, is not accepted internationally, because:

 DPRK's claim is neither based on International law nor Law of the Sea.
 The United Nations Command insisted that the NLL must be maintained until a new maritime MDL could be established through the United Nations Command Military Armistice Commission on the armistice agreement, and the DPRK claim was not established through the UNCMAC.

2010 bombardment 

On November 23, 2010, North Korean artillery shelled Yeonpyeong with dozens of rounds at Yeonpyeong-ri and the surrounding area. This shelling followed a Southern military exercise in the area. The South returned fire with  K-9 self-propelled howitzers. The shelling damaged dozens of houses as well as Southern military infrastructure and set buildings on fire. Two South Korean Marines and two civilians were killed in the shelling, with eighteen others wounded.

Accounts of the billowing smoke were reported in Korean and international newspapers. Thick columns of black smoke rising from the island were the primary proof that the attack had occurred. South Koreans watching television saw the smoke rising from the island after it was hit.

During the bombardment, most of the residents were hiding in a dugout and then escaped to Incheon on a ferry and a fishing boat. Before the bombardment, the number of the residents usually reached about 1400; after the attack, at one time it was down to about 100. It was anticipated that, since the remaining residents were planning to leave as well, the number would keep decreasing. It was also said that there was a relatively high possibility that the island's population would become very scarce. However, in March 2011, 5 months after the bombardment, more than 80% of the residents went back to the island.

In addition, after the attack, there were weapons newly installed to strengthen the security. Because civilians were banned for a time to even enter the island, people presumed that it would end up becoming a military base. To their surprise, however, it turned out that the number of the residents increased and the residents are now known to be diligently and enthusiastically working in their own fields (such as crab fishery) despite the tragic incident. Shelters and dugouts were newly constructed in order for them to be all able to evacuate in the case of emergencies.

Notes

References

External links

 Yeonpyeong Island Map
 North Korean Rocket Launchers Aimed at Yeonpyeong Island

Islands of Incheon
Islands of the Yellow Sea
Ongjin County, Incheon